Michael Mottl (born 26 February 1968) is a sailor from Australia. who represented his country at the 1992 Summer Olympics in Barcelona, Spain as crew member in the Soling. With helmsman William Hodder and fellow crew member Tim Dorning they took the 11th place.

References

Living people
1968 births
Sailors at the 1992 Summer Olympics – Soling
Olympic sailors of Australia
Australian male sailors (sport)
20th-century Australian people